Fritz Pfenninger (15 October 1934 – 12 May 2001) was a Swiss cyclist. He was a specialist in six-day racing, winning a total of 33 events between 1956 and 1970, including 19 with Peter Post.

Track honours

Six-day racing 
 1956 : Aarhus (with Oscar Plattner)
 1957 : Copenhagen (with Jean Roth)
 1958 : Münster, Zurich (with Jean Roth)
 1960 : Münster (with Hans Junkermann)
 1961 : Berlin, Frankfurt (with Klaus Bugdahl)
 1962 : Essen, Frankfurt, Zurich (with Klaus Bugdahl)
 1963 : Cologne, Zurich, Brussels (with Peter Post)
 1964 : Dortmund (with Rudi Altig), Anvers (with Noël Foré and Peter Post), Berlin, Brussels, Zurich (with Peter Post)
 1965 : Berlin, Dortmund, Zurich (with Peter Post)
 1966 : Essen, Ghent, Amsterdam (with Peter Post), Anvers (with Jan Janssen and Peter Post), Quebec (with Sigi Renz)
 1967 : Bremen, Essen, Frankfurt (with Peter Post), Anvers (with Jan Janssen and Peter Post)
 1968 : Montreal (with Louis Pfenninger), Zurich (with Klaus Bugdahl)
 1970 : Zurich (with Peter Post and Erich Spahn)

European Championships 
 Champion of Europe in 1962 (with Klaus Bugdahl), 1964 and 1967 (with Peter Post)

External links 

 

Swiss male cyclists
Swiss track cyclists
1934 births
2001 deaths
Cyclists from Zürich